Soundarya Bala Nandakumar is an Indian singer and actress. She is well known for playing Revathy in the tamil television soap opera,  Pagal Nilavu.

Career 
In 2010, Soundarya made her television debut as a contestant in Super Singer 3. She debuted as a singer with the film 6 Meluguvarthigal (2013). In 2015, she debuted as one of the lead actress in the television series Pagal Nilavu after the makers of the series saw her performance in Super Singer. She garnered acclaim for her role as Revathy in the series, which went on to run for almost 700 episodes.<ref name="S">{{Cite web|url=https://cinema.vikatan.com/television/143300-vignesh-karthik-soundarya-pair-quits-from-pagal-nilavu-serial|title= 'பகல் நிலவி'லிருந்து நானும் விக்னேஷும் ஏன் விலகினோம்?" - விளக்கும் செளந்தர்யா [Why did Vignesh and I leave Pagal Nilavu - Soundarya explains]|date=27 November 2018|work=Vikatan|lang=ta}}</ref> In 2016, she took part in the Super Singer 5 Mini Series. soundarya was featured singing "Thendral Vanthu" in Kabali (2016). She had previously sung that song on Super Singer. Her next song was "Kalavani" in Kodiveeran, which she co-sang with VV Prasanna. In The Times of India review of the film's soundtrack, the reviewer wrote that "A folk duet, Prasanna and Soundarya shine in this one". She later starred with Vignesh Karthick, her Pagal Nilavu co-star in the short film Yours Shamefully, which became viral upon release. The team of the upcoming Master saw the short and subsequently signed soundarya to play a role in the film.

 Controversy 
In 2018, Syed Anwar and Sameera Sherief left Pagal Nilavu. Soundarya told The Times of India how she influenced the makers of the series to give her more screen time. Later that year, Soundarya and Vignesh Karthick left the series as it was hard to continue the series without two of the main characters.

 Filmography All films are in Tamil, unless otherwise noted.''

As a singer

As an actor 
 Films

 Television

 Short films

Awards and nominations

References

External links 

Indian television actresses
Indian women playback singers
Tamil playback singers
Actresses in Tamil cinema
Year of birth missing (living people)
Living people